May mean: 

 Karumariamman Temple, Tiruverkadu, Chennai
 Karumariamman Temple, Penang, Malaysia
 Karumariamman Temple, Jalan Sentul, KL
 Karumariamman temple, Ragavendra
 Karumariamman Temple Jalan Baru